Rhythm For Sale is a 2013 biography of performer, choreographer, and director Leonard Harper. It was written by Grant Harper Reid, Harper's grandson. It was self-published by Reid on CreateSpace.  Rhythm For Sale has a total of 300 pages and the revised edition was published on August 11, 2014. 

The book chronicles Harper's rise from a child performer to Broadway's top black theater director. In 1921 the Schubert Brothers signed Harper with his partner and future wife Osceola Blanks to be the first Black act to tour the all-white Schubert circuit of theaters. In 1923 Harper showcased his cabaret floorshows and black musical comedies in Harlem's Cotton Club and his mainstay Connie's Inn and the Lafayette Theater.

The book details how Harper and black filmmaker Oscar Micheaux created the first all-black talkie motion picture The Exile in 1931. It covers his appearances at Harlem's Apollo Theater. Rhythm For Sale explores the decline of Harper's career as his work became limited to small Harlem nightclubs. His 1943 death from a heart attack while rehearsing his Harperettes chorus line is covered, as is his funeral at the Abyssinian Baptist Church.

On December 18, 2013, the Steve Vibert Pouchie Latin Jazz Ensemble held a book signing event for Rhythm For Sale at Don Coqui's restaurant in New Rochelle, New York.

On February 21, 2018, Rhythm For Sale won the Mid-Manhattan NAACP Branch Founder's Day Black History Month Book Award Winner.

References

External links
 

2013 non-fiction books
Biographies about African-American people
Biographies about actors
CreateSpace books